is a Japanese speed skater who specializes in sprint distances.

Career 
Kamiya competed in the 2013 World Single Distance Speed Skating Championships in Sochi and finished 19th in the 1000m event. She was part of the Japanese team, with Maki Tsuji and Nao Kodaira, that won the team sprint at the 2015–16 ISU Speed Skating World Cup – World Cup 1 and set a new world record of 1:26.82. Kamiya finished fourth at the 500m event of the 2015–16 ISU Speed Skating World Cup – World Cup 3.

Personal records

References

External links
 Eurosport profile
 

1992 births
Living people
Japanese female speed skaters
Speed skaters at the 2018 Winter Olympics
Olympic speed skaters of Japan
21st-century Japanese women